Helen Garrett (May 20, 1929 – October 26, 2006) was an American politician who served in the Kentucky Senate from the 2nd district from 1979 to 1991.

Operation Boptrot
Helen R. Garrett was charged in 1992 with taking a $2,000 bribe from a horse racing track in exchange for helping pass favorable legislation in an FBI Operation called Boptrot. She pled guilty and received four years of probation.

References

1929 births
2006 deaths
Democratic Party Kentucky state senators
20th-century American politicians